Hung Hao-hsuan (born ), better known as Karsa, is a Taiwanese professional League of Legends player for Weibo Gaming. He is known for his strategic jungle play and found success domestically and internationally during his time as a member of the Flash Wolves, winning several LMS titles and topping many international events. Hung has long been considered by many analysts and other professional players as one of the most mechanically skillful players from Taiwan.

Career

Machi 17 
Hung began his professional career in June 2014 with team Machi 17.

Flash Wolves 
In January 2015, Hung joined Flash Wolves. Due to their 1st-place finish at IEM Taipei, Flash Wolves were invited to compete at the IEM Season IX - World Championship. After a Round 1 loss against SK Gaming, Hung and the team went on to beat Cloud9 in Round 1 of the losers bracket. Round 2 of the losers bracket saw the team's 2nd meeting of the tournament with SK Gaming. A win against the European team secured the yoe Flash Wolves a place in the bracket stage. They were eventually knocked out of the tournament in the semifinals after losing to Team SoloMid.

With a second and third place LMS finish under their belt, the Flash Wolves had obtained a tie for the most LMS Championship Points behind AHQ, and were invited to the 2015 Taiwan Regional Finals. There, FW avenged their playoff loss by defeating Hong Kong Esports 3-2 and acquiring a spot in the 2015 Season World Championship.

At the World Championship, the FW were expected by many analysts to have one of the weakest showings of any team in attendance. However, after a 4-2 group stage with wins over favorites KOO Tigers and Counter Logic Gaming, the Flash Wolves emerged first from groups, becoming the first team in two years to finish ahead of a Korean team in groups at Worlds. In the tournament quarterfinals, FW lost 1–3 to Origen, earning a top eight finish.

Hung and the Flash Wolves won the 2016 Spring LMS, qualifying for the 2016 Mid-Season Invitational. At MSI Flash Wolves reached the semi-finals of the 2016 Mid-Season Invitational.

On 2 December 2017, it was announced that Hung had left Flash Wolves.

Royal Never Give Up 
Later, on 20 December, it was announced that he had joined the Chinese team Royal Never Give Up (RNG). In his first season with RNG, Hung won the 2018 Spring LPL season and qualified for the 2018 Mid-Season Invitational. Hung left Royal Never Give Up in November 2019.

Top Esports 
Hung signed with Top Esports in December 2019.

Tournament results

Flash Wolves 
 2015 Intel Extreme Masters Season9 Taipei — 1st
 2015 League of Legends World Championship — 4th–8th
 2016 Spring LMS — 1st
 2016 Mid-Season Invitational — 3rd−4th
 2016 Summer LMS — 1st
 2017 Intel Extreme Masters Season11 World Championship Katowice — 1st
 2017 Spring LMS — 1st
 2017 Summer LMS — 1st

Royal Never Give Up 
 2018 Spring LPL — 1st
 2018 Mid-Season Invitational — 1st
 2018 Summer LPL — 1st

Top Esports 
 2018 LPL Spring — 2nd
 2020 LPL Spring — 2nd
 2020 Mid-Season Cup — 1st
 2020 LPL Summer — 1st

References

External links 
 

Living people
Taiwanese esports players
1997 births
Flash Wolves players
League of Legends jungle players
Royal Never Give Up players